This article lists political parties in South Korea. 

South Korea has a weakly institutionalized multi-party system, characterized by frequent changes in party arrangements. Political parties have a chance of gaining power alone.

Current parties

Main parties

Local-parliamentary parties

Extra-parliamentary parties

Conservative parties

Revolution Party (혁명21당)
Liberty Party (자유당)
Inter-Korean Unification Party (남북통일당)
Pro-Park New Party (친박신당)
Our Republican Party (우리공화당)
Liberty Unification Party (자유통일당), formerly Christian Liberal Unification Party (기독자유통일당)
Dawn of Liberty (자유의새벽당)
Saenuri Party (2017) (새누리당)
New National Participation Party (국민참여신당)
Let's Go! Korea (가자코리아)
The Christian Party (기독당)
Dokdo is Korea Party (독도한국당)
Liberty Democratic Party (자유민주당)
New Korean Peninsula Party (신한반도당)
Party of the Republic of Korea (대한국민당) 
People's Grand United Party (국민대통합당)

Centrist (or conservative liberal) parties
Hongik Party (홍익당)
Let's Go! Peace and Human Rights Party (가자!평화인권당)
Let's Go! Environmental Party (가자환경당)
Korean Welfare Party (한국복지당)
Korean Wave Alliance Party (한류연합당)
Minsaeng Party (민생당)

Liberal parties

Awakened Civic Solidarity Party (깨어있는시민연대당)
Republic of Korea Party (대한민국당)
A Brighter Future Party (더밝은미래당)

Progressive parties
 
Labor Party (노동당)
Green Party (녹색당)
Our Future (미래당)

Single-issue parties
Women's Party (여성의당)
People's Democratic Party (민중민주당)
Small and Medium-sized Businesses and Self-employed Peoples' Party (중소자영업당)
Functional Self-Employment Party (직능자영업당)

Unknown stances, third position, or syncretic parties
National Revolutionary Party (국가혁명당)
The Beggar's Party (거지당), they would go to England to return the portrait of famous Buddhist Monk Jinpyo in the British Museum. They also claim that Queen Elizabeth was Queen Seondeok of Silla in her past life.
United Korean People's Party (통일한국당), Samgyun-ist party, where republican and nationalist political thought merge.
New Han People's Peninsula Peace Party (신한반도체제평화당), pan-Korean nationalism and Cheondoism, claims to support the unification of not only the Korean Peninsula, but of lands where Koreans are located in China, Russia, and Japan as well.
Chungcheong's Future Party (충청의미래당), a local political party in the Chungcheong region.

Parties in formation
These parties are not legal acting political parties yet, but are in the process of gathering petition signatures to become formal political parties.

Defunct parties

Conservative parties

Mainstream parties
 National Alliance for the Rapid Realization of Korean Independence (1946–1951)
 Liberal Party (1951–1960)
 Democratic Republican Party (1963–1980)
 Democratic Justice Party (1981–1990)
 Democratic Liberal Party → New Korea Party (1990–1997)
 Hannara Party → Saenuri Party → Liberty Korea Party (1997–2020)

Minor parties
 Korean Resistance Party (1945–1950)
 Federation Korean National Independence (1947–1951)
 Korea National Party (1947–1958)
 Korean National Party → New Democratic Republican Party (1981–1990)
 United People's Party → Democratic Party (1992–1995) 
 United Liberal Democrats (1995–2006)
 People First Party (2005–2008)
 Liberty Forward Party → Advancement Unification Party (2008–2012)
 Pro-Park Coalition → Future Hope Alliance (2008–2012)
 Hannara Party (2012)
 Evergreen Korea Party (2017–2018)
 Grand National United Party (2017–2018)
 Bareun Party (2017–2018)
 Bareunmirae Party (2018–2020)
 New Conservative Party (2020)
 Republican Party (공화당) (2014–2020), merged with Christian Liberal Unification Party (기독자유통일당) to form National Revolutionary Party (국민혁명당).
 Uri Party (2021)
 Free Korea 21 (2016–2021), formerly Korea Economic Party, merged with Liberty Democratic Party.
 Ahn Cheol-soo's People's Party (2020-2022), merged with the People Power.
Pro-Park Coalition (친박연대) (2012-2022)
Future Korean Peninsula Union (한반도미래연합) (2016-2022)

Liberal parties

Mainstream parties
 Korea Democratic Party → Democratic National Party (1945–1955)
 Democratic Party (1955–1961)
 Civil Rule Party (1963–1965)
 People's Party → New Democratic Party (1965–1980)
 Democratic Korea Party (1981–1988)
 New Korea and Democratic Party (1984–1988)
 Reunification Democratic Party (1987–1990)
 Peace Democratic Party (1987–1991)
 Democratic Party (1991–1995)
 National Congress for New Politics (1995–2000)
 Millennium Democratic Party → Democratic Party (2000–2008)
 The People's Party for Freedom → Uri Party (2002–2007)
 Grand Unified Democratic New Party (2007–2008)
 United Democratic Party → Democratic Party (2008–2011)
 Democratic United Party → Democratic Party (2011–2014)

Minor parties
 Democratic Party (1963–1965)
 Democratic Unification Party (1973–1980)
 Democratic Party (1990–1991)
 Democratic Party (1995–1997)
 The Participation Party (2010–2011)
 New Political Vision Party (2014)
 Democratic Party (2014–2016)
 People's Party (2016–2018)
 Bareunmirae Party (2018–2020)
 Party for Democracy and Peace (2018–2020)
 New Alternatives (2019–2020)
 Future Democratic Party (2020)
 Open Democratic Party (2020–2022)
Kim Dong-yeon's New Wave - Squid Party (새로운물결 - 오징어당) (2021-2022)

Progressive parties

 Preparatory Committee for National Construction → People's Party of Korea → People's Labor Party (1945–1950)
 Workers' Party of South Korea (1946–1953)
 Socialist Party (1951–1953)
 Progressive Party (1956–1958, banned)
 United Socialist Party of Korea (1961–1967)
Revolutionary Party for Reunification → National Democratic Front of South Korea → Anti-Imperialist National Democratic Front (1969–2005, banned)
 Hankyoreh Democratic Party (1988–1991)
 People's Party (1988)
 Popular Party (1990–1992)
 People's Victory 21 → Democratic Labor Party (1997–2011)
 Youth Progressive Party → Socialist Party → Korea Socialist Party → Socialist Party (1998–2012)
 New Progressive Party (2008–2012)
Unified Progressive Party (2011–2014, banned)
 People's United Party (2016–2017)
 New People's Party (2017)
Socialist Revolutionary Workers' Party, merged with Labor Party. (2016–2022)

Green parties
 Korea Greens (2004–2008)

See also
 List of ruling political parties by country
 Politics of South Korea
 Conservatism in South Korea
 Liberalism in South Korea
 Progressivism in South Korea

Notes

References

Bibliography
The present state of registered political parties, National Election Commission of S. Korea.
The present state of political parties registration, National Election Commission of S. Korea, May 29, 2008.

South Korea

Political parties
Political parties
South Korea